Susan Sirma (born May 26, 1966) is a retired Kenyan middle-distance runner best known for winning a bronze medal over 3000 metres at the 1991 World Championships, becoming the first black African woman to win a track and field medal at World Championship or Olympic level.

Sirma also won two gold medals over this distance at the All-Africa Games, in fact the only times the 3000 metres was staged at the Games. In 1991 she also won the 1500 metres, her championship record still standing.

She attended the Singore Girls Secondary School in Iten. Later, she shifted her base to Japan.
. Fellow Kenyan-born runners Sally Barsosio and Lornah Kiplagat are her cousins.

Achievements

References

External links

sports-reference

1966 births
Living people
Kenyan female middle-distance runners
Kenyan female cross country runners
Olympic female middle-distance runners
Olympic athletes of Kenya
Athletes (track and field) at the 1988 Summer Olympics
Athletes (track and field) at the 1992 Summer Olympics
African Games gold medalists for Kenya
African Games medalists in athletics (track and field)
African Games silver medalists for Kenya
Athletes (track and field) at the 1987 All-Africa Games
Athletes (track and field) at the 1991 All-Africa Games
World Athletics Championships athletes for Kenya
World Athletics Championships medalists
Japan Championships in Athletics winners